The Heliantheae (sometimes called the sunflower tribe) are the third-largest tribe in the sunflower family (Asteraceae). With some 190 genera and nearly 2500 recognized species, only the tribes Senecioneae and Astereae are larger. The name is derived from the genus Helianthus, which is Greek for sun flower. Most genera and species are found in North America (particularly in Mexico) and South America.  A few genera are pantropical.

Most Heliantheae are herbs or shrubs, but some grow to the size of small trees.  Leaves are usually hairy and arranged in opposite pairs. The anthers are usually blackened.

The above statements about the size and distribution of the tribe apply to a broad definition of Heliantheae, which was followed throughout the 20th century. Some recent authors break the tribe up into a dozen or so smaller tribes.

Uses
Commercially important plants in the Heliantheae include sunflower and Jerusalem artichoke.  Many garden flowers are also in this group, such as Coreopsis, Cosmos, Echinacea, Rudbeckia, and Zinnia. Some authors place Coreopsis and Cosmos in the Coreopsideae tribe.

In addition to the benefits brought by the group, some are also problematic weeds. Species of Ambrosia (ragweed) produce large quantities of pollen. Each plant is reputed to be able to produce about a billion grains of pollen over a season, and the plant is wind-pollinated.

Taxonomy

The traditional circumscription of the Heliantheae arises from Cassini's 19th-century classification of the Asteraceae.  This broad group been divided by some authors into smaller tribes: Bahieae, Chaenactideae, Coreopsideae, Helenieae, Heliantheae sensu stricto, Madieae, Millerieae, Perityleae, Polymnieae, and Tageteae.  Because the Eupatorieae originated from within the Heliantheae (broadly defined), to maintain monophyletic taxa it is necessary to either make Eupatorieae a subtribe within Heliantheae or to split the Heliantheae into smaller tribes. Such classifications may define a supertribe Helianthodae including these smaller tribes, the Eupatorieae, and a few other tribes such as Inuleae.

Subtribes and genera
Heliantheae subtribes and genera recognized by the Global Compositae Database as of May 2022:

Subtribe Ambrosiinae 
Ambrosia 
Dicoria 
Euphrosyne 
Hedosyne 
Iva 
Parthenice 
Parthenium 
Xanthium 

Subtribe Chromolepidinae 
Chromolepis 

Subtribe Dugesiinae 
Dugesia 

Subtribe Ecliptinae 
Aspilia 
Baltimora 
Blainvillea 
Calyptocarpus 
Clibadium 
Damnxanthodium 
Delilia 
Dimerostemma 
Eclipta 
Elaphandra 
Eleutheranthera 
Exomiocarpon 
Fenixia 
Hoffmanniella 
Idiopappus 
Iogeton 
Jefea 
Kingianthus 
Lantanopsis 
Lasianthaea 
Leptocarpha 
Lipochaeta 
Lundellianthus 
Melanthera 
Monactis 
Oblivia 
Otopappus 
Oyedaea 
Pascalia 
Pentalepis 
Perymeniopsis 
Perymenium 
Plagiolophus 
Podanthus 
Rensonia 
Riencourtia 
Schizoptera 
Sphagneticola 
Steiractinia 
Synedrella 
Synedrellopsis 
Tilesia 
Trigonopterum 
Tuberculocarpus 
Tuxtla 
Wamalchitamia 
Wedelia 
Wollastonia 
Zexmenia 
Zyzyxia 

Subtribe Enceliinae 
Encelia 
Enceliopsis 
Flourensia 
Geraea 
Helianthella 

Subtribe Engelmanniinae 
Agnorhiza 
Berlandiera 
Borrichia 
Chrysogonum 
Engelmannia 
Lindheimera 
Silphium 
Vigethia 
Wyethia 

Subtribe Helianthinae 
Aldama 
Alvordia 
Bahiopsis 
Calanticaria 
Davilanthus 
Helianthus 
Heliomeris 
Hymenostephium 
Iostephane 
Lagascea 
Pappobolus 
Phoebanthus 
Rhysolepis 
Scalesia 
Sclerocarpus 
Simsia 
Stuessya 
Syncretocarpus 
Tithonia 
Viguiera 

Subtribe Montanoinae 
Montanoa 

Subtribe Rojasianthinae 
Rojasianthe 

Subtribe Rudbeckiinae 
Ratibida 
Rudbeckia 

Subtribe Spilanthinae 
Acmella 
Oxycarpha 
Salmea 
Spilanthes 
Tetranthus 

Subtribe Verbesininae 
Podachaenium 
Squamopappus 
Tetrachyron 
Verbesina 

Subtribe Zaluzaniinae 
Hybridella 
Zaluzania 

Subtribe Zinniinae 
Echinacea 
Heliopsis 
Philactis 
Sanvitalia 
Tehuana 
Trichocoryne 
Zinnia

References

Bibliography

 
 
 
 Bremer, Kåre. (1994). Asteraceae: Cladistics & Classification. Portland, OR: Timber Press. .
 Robinson, Harold Ernest. (1981). A Revision of the Tribal and Subtribal Limits of the Heliantheae (Asteraceae). Smithsonian Contributions to Botany: 51.
 Strother, John L. (1991). Taxonomy of Complaya, Elaphandra, Iogeton, Jefea, Wamalchitamia, Wedelia, Zexmenia, and Zyzyxia (Compositae - Heliantheae - Ecliptinae). Systematic Botany Monographs: 33.

External links

 
Asteraceae tribes